Hynhamia patatea is a species of moth of the family Tortricidae. It lives in Ecuador.

The wingspan is about 26 mm. The ground colour of the forewings is cream, with slight brown admixture. The suffusions and dots are brownish. The hindwings are whitish cream.

Etymology
The specific name refers to the name of the type locality.

References

Moths described in 2011
Hynhamia